Englisch für Anfänger is a German television series.

See also
List of German television series

External links
 

1982 German television series debuts

English-language education television programming
Das Erste original programming